Andy Goldfine (born 1954), is an American businessperson, founder of Aerostich, and founder of Ride To Work nonprofit to support motorcycle commuting through its annual Ride To Work Day. In 2013, he was awarded the American Motorcyclist Association (AMA) Dud Perkins Lifetime Achievement Award for his "generous and tireless support of motorcycling" with his business and nonprofit activities, and contributions as an AMA board member. In 2016, he was named Motorcyclist of the Year by Motorcyclist magazine.

Motorcycle apparel career 
Goldfine created the Aerostich Roadcrafter suit c. 1982, noted as "the first synthetic textile armored riding suit", made with Cordura and "worn by almost every motorcycle journalist when they're really riding". Goldfine has been called "one of the early leaders and innovators in motorcycle safety clothing", and "a revolutionary — a guy who changed the motorcycling world". Cycle World said "if there is ever a motorcycle gear hall of fame, Andy Goldfine should be inducted."

Author Melissa Holbrook Pierson has noted Goldfine's contribution to motorcycling by holding that it is a social good, and he has been cited as an expert on motorcycling culture as expressed through rider clothing.

This ride with partner Helge Pedersen was part of a much longer journey Pedersen took, documented in his book 10 Years on 2 Wheels.

Bibliography
 (foreword)

Notes

Sources

Further reading

People from Duluth, Minnesota
Businesspeople from Minnesota
Dud Perkins Award winners
Long-distance motorcycle riders
1954 births
Living people